Andira galeottiana is a species of legume in the family Fabaceae. It is found only in the Mexican states of Chiapas, Oaxaca, and Veracruz.

References

Faboideae
Vulnerable plants
Flora of Chiapas
Flora of Oaxaca
Flora of Veracruz
Taxonomy articles created by Polbot